

Fractional currency, also referred to as shinplasters, was introduced by the United States federal government following the outbreak of the Civil War. These low-denomination banknotes of the United States dollar were in use between 21 August 1862 and 15 February 1876, and issued in denominations of 3, 5, 10, 15, 25, and 50 cents across five issuing periods. The complete type set below is part of the National Numismatic Collection, housed at the National Museum of American History, part of the Smithsonian Institution.

History

The Civil War economy catalyzed a shortage of United States coinage—gold and silver coins were hoarded given their intrinsic bullion value relative to irredeemable paper currency at the time. In late 1861, to help finance the Civil War, the U.S. government borrowed gold coin from New York City banks in exchange for Seven-thirties treasury notes and the New York banks sold them to the public for gold to repay the loan. In December 1861, the Trent Affair shook public confidence with the threat of war on a second front. The United States Department of the Treasury suspended specie payments and banks in New York City stopped redeeming paper money for gold and silver. In the absence of gold and silver coin, the premium for specie began to devalue paper currency. After the New York banks suspended specie payments (quickly followed by Boston and Philadelphia) the premium on gold rose from 1–3% over paper in early January 1862 to 9% over paper in June 1862, by which time one paper dollar was worth 91.69 cents in gold. This fueled currency speculation (e.g., redeeming banknotes for silver coin which was then sold at a premium as bullion), and created significant disruption across businesses and trade. Alternate methods of providing small change included the reintroduction of Spanish quarter dollars in Philadelphia, cutting dollar bills in quarters or halves, refusing to provide change (without charging a premium for providing silver coins), or the issuance of locally issued shinplasters (i.e., those issued by businesses or local municipalities), which was forbidden by law in many states.

Treasurer of the United States Francis E. Spinner has been credited with finding the solution to the shortage of coinage: he created postage currency (which led into the use of fractional currency). Postage (or postal) currency was the first of five issues of US Post Office fractional paper money printed in 5-cent, 10-cent, 25-cent, and 50-cent denominations and issued from 21 August 1862 through 27 May 1863. Spinner proposed using postage stamps, affixed to Treasury paper, with his signature on the bottom (see illustration below). Based on this initiative, Congress supported a temporary solution involving fractional currency and on 17 July 1862 President Lincoln signed the Postage Currency Bill into law. The intent, however, was not that stamps should be a circulating currency.

The design of the first issue (postage currency) was directly based on Spinner's original handmade examples. Some varieties even had a perforated stamp-like edge. While not considered a legal tender, postage currency could be exchanged for United States Notes in $5 lots and were receivable in payment of all dues to the United States, up to $5. Subsequent issues would no longer include images of stamps and were referred to as Fractional Currency. Despite the July 1862 legislation, postage stamps remained a form of currency until postage currency gained momentum in the spring of 1863. In 1863, Secretary Chase asked for a new fractional currency that was harder to counterfeit than the postage currency. The new fractional currency notes were different from the 1862 postage currency issues. They were more colorful with printing on the reverse, and several anti-counterfeiting measures were employed: experimental paper, adding surcharges, overprints, blue endpaper, silk fibers, and watermarks to name a few. Fractional currency shields which had single-sided specimens were sold to banks to provide a standard for comparison for detecting counterfeits. Postage and fractional currency remained in use until 1876, when Congress authorized the minting of fractional silver coins to redeem the outstanding fractional currency.

Issuing periods and varieties

Complete type set of United States fractional currency

Portraits of living individuals

Three people were depicted on fractional currency during their lifetime: Francis E. Spinner (Treasurer of the United States), William P. Fessenden (U.S. Senator and Secretary of the Treasury), and Spencer M. Clark (Superintendent of the National Currency Bureau). Both Spinner and Clark decided to have their portrait depicted on currency, which created controversy. Republican Representative Martin R. Thayer of Pennsylvania was an outspoken critic, suggesting that the Treasury's privilege of portrait selection for currency was being abused. On 7 April 1866, led by Thayer, Congress enacted legislation specifically stating "that no portrait or likeness of any living person hereafter engraved, shall be placed upon any of the bonds, securities, notes, fractional or postal currency of the United States." On the date of passage, a number of plates for the new 15-cent note depicting William Tecumseh Sherman and Ulysses S. Grant had been completed, as the plate proofs for these exist in the archives of the Smithsonian Institute's National Museum of American History. However, the plates were never used to produce notes for circulation. The only Sherman-Grant examples produced were single sided specimens that were placed on Fractional Currency Shields.

See also

Federal Reserve System
List of people on United States banknotes
Treasury Note (19th century)
United States postal notes

References

Notes

References

Books and journals

Further reading

Currency lists
Historical currencies of the United States
Paper money of the United States
Banknotes of the United States